Leptomeria is a genus of flowering plants, endemic to Australia.
Species include:

Leptomeria acida R.Br. - Native currant, sour currant bush
Leptomeria aphylla R.Br.
Leptomeria axillaris R.Br.
Leptomeria cunninghamii Miq.
Leptomeria dielsiana Pilg. - Diel's currant bush
Leptomeria drupacea (Labill.) Druce
Leptomeria ellytes Lepschi
Leptomeria empetriformis Miq.
Leptomeria furtiva Lepschi
Leptomeria glomerata F.Muell. ex Hook.f.
Leptomeria hirtella Miq.
Leptomeria lehmannii Miq.
Leptomeria pachyclada Diels
Leptomeria pauciflora R.Br. - Sparse-flowered currant bush
Leptomeria preissiana (Miq.) A.DC.
Leptomeria scrobiculata R.Br.
Leptomeria squarrulosa R.Br.

References

External links
 Leptomeria acida at Parasitic plants
 Leptomeria pachyclada

Santalaceae
Santalales genera